Pimelea haematostachya, commonly known as pimelea poppy, is a species of flowering plant in the family Thymelaeaceae and is endemic to Queensland. It is a perennial herb with narrowly egg-shaped or narrowly elliptic leaves and heads of red flowers.

Description
Pimelea haematostachya is a perennial herb that usually grows to a height of  but has a woody base. Flowering mainly occurs from June to February.

Taxonomy
Pimelea haematostachya was first formally described in 1859 by Ferdinand von Mueller in Fragmenta Phytographiae Australiae from specimens collected near the Burnett River.

Distribution and habitat
This pimelea grows in grassland from near the Gilbert River to near the Burnett River in north Queensland.

Conservation status
Pimelea haematostachya is listed as "least concern" under the Queensland Government Nature Conservation Act 1992.

References

Malvales of Australia
haematostachya
Flora of Queensland
Taxa named by Ferdinand von Mueller
Plants described in 1859